Sarband-e Pain (also Romanized as Sarband-e Pā’īn; also known as Sar Band) is a village in Julaki Rural District, Jayezan District, Omidiyeh County, Khuzestan Province, Iran. At the 2006 census, its population was 318, in 75 families.

References 

Populated places in Omidiyeh County